Ben John (born 28 February 1991) is a retired Welsh rugby union player. A centre, he played club rugby for the Ospreys regional team having previously played for Aberavon RFC.

He has recently made a return to football for Shene Old Grammarians, as a goalkeeper. He is currently the reserve keeper behind club stalwart and current Captain's Player of the Season, George Williams.

References

External links
 Ospreys profile
 

1991 births
Living people
Aberavon RFC players
Dragons RFC players
Ospreys (rugby union) players
Rugby union players from Morriston
Welsh rugby union players
Rugby union centres